Haplotinea is a very small genus of fungus moths (family Tineidae). Its subfamily among the fungus moths is disputed – many assign it to the Myrmecozelinae, but other authors have placed it in subfamily Nemapogoninae or Perissomasticinae. In all, its relationships are barely better resolved at present than those of the many Tineidae incertae sedis.

Only two species are placed in Haplotinea at present:
 Haplotinea ditella (Pierce, Diakonoff & Metcalfe, 1938)
 Haplotinea insectella (Fabricius, 1794) (= H. fuscescentella, H. misella, H. rusticella)

Footnotes

References
  (2009): Haplotinea. Version 2.1, 2009-DEC-22. Retrieved 2010-MAY-05.
  (2004): Butterflies and Moths of the World, Generic Names and their Type-species – Haplotinea. Version of 2004-NOV-05. Retrieved 2010-MAY-05.
  [2010]: Global Taxonomic Database of Tineidae (Lepidoptera). Retrieved 2010-MAY-05.
  (200a): Markku Savela's Lepidoptera and some other life forms – Haplotinea. Version of 2001-NOV-04. Retrieved 2010-MAY-05.

Myrmecozelinae
Taxa named by Alexey Diakonoff
Tineidae genera